is a Japanese web manga series written and illustrated by Rimukoro. It has been serialized online via Kadokawa Shoten's Comic Newtype website since October 2017 and has been collected in twelve tankōbon volumes. An anime television series adaptation by Doga Kobo aired on AT-X and Tokyo MX from April to June 2019.

Plot
Kuroto Nakano is a young salaryman with a very unhappy and stressful life, almost entirely occupied by his job at the company for which he works. One night, after yet another day spent overworking, the moment he opens the door of his home he finds a seemingly young girl with fox ears and a tail cooking dinner for him – her name is Senko, an 800-year-old fox demigod. Senko has been sent to Earth from the spirit world to relieve Kuroto from his unhappy life and help him find happiness again.

Characters

Senko is an 800-year-old kitsune sent from the spirit world to relieve Kuroto from his overworked and stressful life. She proudly goes above and beyond for Kuroto, pampering him, cooking for him and cleaning his home. She moves into Kuroto's home and acts like a helpful wife and mother. 
Senko loves to pamper Kuroto such as cleaning him, massage, groom and gives him lap pillows to ensure he gets enough sleep. She gets sad if Kuroto prioritizes work over his health. To her dismay, Kuroto seems to have a fixation on her soft fluffy tail and ears. 

Kuroto is a regular salaryman that lived an unregulated life prior to Senko's arrival. He grew up in the countryside with his grandparents before moving out to the city to work. Kuroto's health and spirit have improved over time thanks to Senko's care.

Another kitsune sent to assist Kuroto due to Senko's initial difficulty in relieving the man from the darkness consuming his heart. Far more conceited and spontaneous than Senko, she sees Kuroto as a servant, thinking that humans should worship the kitsunes sent to help them. She later befriends Yasuko.

Yasuko is Kuroto's next door neighbor. She is a university student and a manga artist, spending most of her time drawing manga in her bedroom. Yasuko is shown to be lazy and messy as she eats microwave ready meals and rarely cleans her home. As a result, Yasuko appreciates Senko's company whenever the latter comes over to clean up and prepares meals for her. Yasuko is not aware that Senko is a kitsune and mistakes her for a cosplayer. She is also an otaku and loves watching an anime called Little Yoko, Inari Girl, which features a magical fox fighting off an evil tanuki.

A kitsune that is over 1000 years old. Yozora is Senko and Shiro's boss; she was the one that sent them to the human realm to care for Kuroto. Much to Senko's dismay, Yozora loves to playfully seduce Kuroto with her breasts and four tails.

The titular heroine of an anime called Little Yoko, Inari Girl.

Media

Manga

Anime
An anime television series adaptation was announced on December 2, 2018. The series is animated by Doga Kobo and directed by Tomoaki Koshida, with Yoshiko Nakamura handling series composition, and Miwa Oshima designing the characters. Yoshiaki Fujisawa composed the music. The series aired from April 10 to June 26, 2019, on AT-X and various local television stations. The opening theme is  performed by Azumi Waki and Maaya Uchida, while the ending theme is  performed by Waki. The series ran for 12 episodes. Funimation has licensed the series.

Reception
The anime has a rating of 4.8/5 on Crunchyroll based on 96 votes. LofZOdyssey of Comic Watch gave the anime a 7.6/10 rating, the writer stating, "If you're expecting fast-paced, hyper-energetic slapstick comedy from this show, it's best to put that thought to rest now. Senko-san was a much slower series than most, and when we pause for a moment, that makes a lot of sense."

Gadget Tsūshin included Senko's catchphrase ("uyan") in their 2019 list of the most popular anime-related buzzwords.

Notes

References

External links
Sewayaki Kitsune no Senko-san at Comic Newtype 
 

Animated television series about foxes
Anime series based on manga
AT-X (TV network) original programming
Comedy anime and manga
Doga Kobo
Fantasy anime and manga
Funimation
Iyashikei anime and manga
Japanese webcomics
Kadokawa Dwango franchises
Kadokawa Shoten manga
Muse Communication
Seinen manga
Webcomics in print